Bulkington is a village in Warwickshire, England.

Bulkington may also refer to:

 Bulkington (character), a character in Moby Dick
 Bulkington, Wiltshire, England
 Bulkington railway station, Warwickshire, England
 Bulkington Pass, Antarctica